Besov (from бес meaning demon) is a Russian masculine surname, its feminine counterpart is Besova. Notable people with the surname include:

Elena Besova (born 1966), Russian judoka
Oleg Besov (born 1933), Russian mathematician

Russian-language surnames